Willis Curdy (born October 30, 1947) is an American politician. He has served as a Democratic member for the 98th district in the Montana House of Representatives  since 2015.

Curdy was born in Bitterroot Valley in 1947 and currently resides in Missoula, Montana. He also attended the University of Montana, once from 1967 to 1971 and once in 1987.

References

1947 births
Living people
People from Missoula, Montana
University of Montana alumni
Democratic Party members of the Montana House of Representatives
Montana State University alumni
21st-century American politicians